In computer programming, self-documenting (or self-describing) source code and user interfaces follow naming conventions and structured programming conventions that enable use of the system without prior specific knowledge. In web development, self-documenting refers to a website that exposes the entire process of its creation through public documentation, and whose public documentation is part of the development process.

Objectives
Commonly stated objectives for self-documenting systems include:

 Make source code easier to read and understand
 Minimize the effort required to maintain or extend legacy systems
 Reduce the need for users and developers of a system to consult secondary documentation sources such as code comments or software manuals
 Facilitate automation through self-contained knowledge representation

Conventions
Self-documenting code is ostensibly written using human-readable names, typically consisting of a phrase in a human language which reflects the symbol's meaning, such as article.numberOfWords or TryOpen. The code must also have a clear and clean structure so that a human reader can easily understand the algorithm used.

Practical considerations
There are certain practical considerations that influence whether and how well the objectives for a self-documenting system can be realized.

 uniformity of naming conventions
 consistency
 scope of the application and system requirements

Examples
Below is a very simple example of self-documenting code, using naming conventions in place of explicit comments to make the logic of the code more obvious to human readers.

size_t count_alphabetic_chars(const char *text)
{
    if (text == NULL)
        return 0;

    size_t  count = 0;

    while (*text != '\0')
    {
        if (is_alphabetic(*text))
            count++;
        text++;
    }

    return count;
}

Criticism 
Jef Raskin criticized the belief in "self-documenting" code by saying that code cannot explain the rationale behind why the program is being written or why it is implemented in such a way.

See also
 Autological word
 Code readability
 Comment (computer programming)
 Controlled natural language
 Literate programming
 Natural language programming

References

Further reading
 

Computer programming
Software documentation